Bambusa balcooa is a clumping bamboo native from the Indian subcontinent to Indo-China.

Description 

Uses 
The length and strength of Bambusa balcooa make it a useful material for the construction industry.

B. balcooa has recently gained popularity in South Africa as the species of choice for commercial plantations. Although not native to that country, it is the most prominent "giant" bamboo that is accepted as a naturalized species, since its introduction into South Africa during the 1600s. Government tenders were awarded for trials and studies to determine the feasibility of large-scale cultivation of bamboo in South Africa. However, after several years of research on the Bambusa balcooa species by industry leaders such as Camille Rebelo, it was a group called Ecoplanet Bamboo Group that became the first entity to successfully grow the species at commercial scale. More recently, the South African government and other corporations such as ECDC have begun to realize the true economic potential of this giant bamboo in agricultural and forestry sectors.

References



balcooa
Flora of the Indian subcontinent
Flora of Indo-China
Plants described in 1832